Topocuvirus is a genus of viruses, in the family Geminiviridae. Dicotyledonous plants serve as natural hosts. There is only one species in this genus: Tomato pseudo-curly top virus. Diseases associated with this genus include: vein swelling, curling of the leaves and leaf distortion.

Structure
Viruses in Topocuvirus are non-enveloped, with icosahedral geometries, and T=1 symmetry. The diameter is around 22 nm, with a length of 38 nm. Genomes are circular and non-segmented, around 2.86kb in length.

Life cycle
Viral replication is nuclear. Entry into the host cell is achieved by penetration into the host cell. Replication follows the ssDNA rolling circle model. DNA-templated transcription is the method of transcription. The virus exits the host cell by nuclear pore export, and  tubule-guided viral movement. Dicotyledonous plants serve as the natural host. The virus is transmitted via a vector (treehopper). Transmission routes are vector.

References

External links
 Viralzone: Topocuvirus
 ICTV

Geminiviridae
Virus genera